The 1967 Coupe de France Final was a football match held at Stade Olympique Yves-du-Manoir, Colombes on May 21, 1967, that saw Olympique Lyonnais defeat FC Sochaux-Montbéliard 3–1 thanks to goals by Angel Rambert, André Perrin and Fleury Di Nallo.

Match details

See also
Coupe de France 1966-67

External links
Coupe de France results at Rec.Sport.Soccer Statistics Foundation
Report on French federation site

Coupe De France Final
1967
Coupe De France Final 1967
Coupe De France Final 1967
Coupe de France Final
Sport in Saint-Denis, Seine-Saint-Denis
Coupe de France Final